Serafino Fortibraccia, O.P. (died 1571) was a Roman Catholic prelate who served as Bishop of Nemosia (1569–1571).

Biography
Serafino Fortibraccia was ordained a bishop in the Order of Preachers. On 24 January 1569, he was appointed during the papacy of Pope Pius V as Bishop of Nemosia. On 13 February 1569, he was consecrated bishop by Giulio Antonio Santorio, Archbishop of Santa Severina, with Giovanni Agostino Campanile, Bishop of Minori, and Umberto Locati, Bishop of Bagnoregio, serving as co-consecrators. He served as Bishop of Nemosia until his death in 1571 in the Siege of Famagusta.

References 

16th-century Roman Catholic bishops in the Republic of Venice
Bishops appointed by Pope Pius V
1571 deaths
Dominican bishops